Robert Sherwood Morse (April 10, 1924 – May 28, 2015) was an American bishop who became the founding archbishop of the Anglican Province of Christ the King.

A 1950 graduate of Seabury-Western Theological Seminary, he was ordained to the diaconate on July 8, 1950, and to the priesthood on February 22, 1951.

He founded the Anglican Province of Christ the King in 1977 and was a leader in the American Church Union.

References

External links 
Official biography

1924 births
2015 deaths
American Continuing Anglican bishops
American Anglo-Catholics
Anglo-Catholic bishops